Tipiqucha (Quechua tipi Pennisetum clandestinum (a grass species), qucha lake, hispanicized spelling Tipicocha) is a lake in the Junín Region in Peru. It located in the Jauja Province, Apata District, near a populated place of that name.

See also
List of lakes in Peru

References

Lakes of Peru
Lakes of Junín Region
Populated places in the Junín Region